Sereno Peck Fenn (April 25, 1844 – January 3, 1927) was an early partner in Sherwin-Williams. He was hired as a bookkeeper in 1870 for the Sherwin-Williams Company, and was made a partner ten years later. Fenn held the title of Vice-President of the company from 1921 to 1927. Fenn College was named after him in 1930. A bequest of $100,000 was left to Fenn College, which is now named Cleveland State University. Fenn is buried in the Lake View Cemetery. Fenn was also president of the Cleveland YMCA for 25 years.

External links

Where, oh where, did the Fenn money go?
Encyclopedia of Cleveland History:FENN, SERENO PECK

1844 births
1927 deaths
History of Cleveland
Businesspeople from Cleveland
Burials at Lake View Cemetery, Cleveland
Cleveland State University people